Kuala Selangor is a town in northwestern Selangor, Malaysia. It is the largest town and administrative centre of the coterminous Kuala Selangor District.

Etymology
The name Kuala Selangor means Estuary of the Selangor River.

History 
Kuala Selangor was the capital of the Sultanate of Selangor during its early years in the 18th century. It was relocated to Jugra in Kuala Langat region in 1827, then Klang in the 1870s.

Location 
Kuala Selangor town is located at the estuary of the Selangor River, where it drains into the Strait of Malacca. It is located 55 km north-west of downtown Kuala Lumpur, and 42 km north-west of Shah Alam, the capital of Selangor.

Kuala Selangor town is the largest town of the coterminous Kuala Selangor region, which also contains the adjacent towns of Tanjung Karang, Ijok, Puncak Alam, Bestari Jaya and Jeram.

Tourist attractions

Bukit Melawati

Kampung Kuantan fireflies

Kampung Kuantan is well known for its fireflies. Moreover, there has been opinion that magical fireflies are only available at two places in the world and one of it is in Kampung Kuantan.

The adventure of the fireflies' area began in the early 1970s by a local businessman who saw the commercial potential of this miracle. Now, the adventure has been entrusted to the Kuala Selangor District Council and has expanded rapidly with the addition of 27 small boats for the visitors.

Kuala Selangor Nature Park
Kuala Selangor Nature Park was opened in 1987. The park is under the management of the Malaysia Nature Lovers Association, ensuring the natural environment of the park is preserved without any habitat damage.

Transportation

Road 
Kuala Selangor is connected to Sungai Buloh and Kepong by national highway 54. This is the main access road from downtown Kuala Lumpur. The Kuala Lumpur-Kuala Selangor toll road (LATAR) E25 is another access route, providing access from Rawang. The upcoming West Coast Expressway will provide access to Banting, Klang, Teluk Intan, Ipoh and Taiping.

Kuala Selangor is also accessible from the royal capital Klang via national highway 5.

Public transit 
Kuala Selangor currently is not connected to any rail transit line. However, Selangor Omnibus route 100 runs from  LRT Masjid Jamek,  KTM Kepong Sentral and  MRT/KTM Sungai Buloh between 05:00 and 20:00 daily.

A branch line of the KTM  once connected Kuala Selangor to Padang Jawa; the line was closed in 1933.

In popular culture

Movies
Mukhsin (2007)
Ngangkung (2010)

References 

Kuala Selangor District
Towns in Selangor